Nirajul Mic River may refer to:

 Nirajul Mic (Câmpu Cetății), one of the headwaters of the river Niraj, near Câmpu Cetății
 Nirajul Mic (Miercurea Nirajului), a tributary of the river Niraj, near Miercurea Nirajului

See also 
 Nirajul Mare
 Niraj